Fabio Macellari (born 23 August 1974 in Sesto San Giovanni) is an Italian footballer who currently plays as a defender for Bobbiese in Prima Categoria.

Football career
Macellari started his career at Pro Sesto (Serie C1). He then signed by U.S. Lecce, at that time in Serie B. He followed the team to Serie C1 in summer 1995, but won the promotion to Serie A within the following two season.

In the 1997–98 season, he failed to taste the Serie A football, because he was transferred to Cagliari Calcio. But he finally tasted top division football in summer 1998.

He helped the club avoid relegation the following season, but not during the 1999–2000 season, although his performances still earned him a transfer to F.C. Internazionale Milano, in a cash-plus-player deal. Macellari was valued 14,500 million lire. (€7,488,625)

In June 2001, half of the registration rights of Macellari was signed by Bologna (Serie A) for 12,000 million lire (€6,197,483) However Inter paid the same amount to acquire half of Jonathan Binotto. Serious injury blocked Macellari to play for Bologna, so his contract was terminated in October 2002. Macellari then joined Cagliari (Serie B) in January 2003, played for one and a half season, won the promotion again.

Late career
After the second experience in Cagliari, he chose to play in lower leagues, joining the following teams: Pavia (Serie C1), Triestina (Serie B), Lucchese, Sangiovannese (Serie C1), Villasimius, Vado, Loanesi, Finale (Eccellenza) and U.S.Bobbiese (Prima Categoria).

Honours
Lecce
Serie B promotion as third place: 1996–97

Cagliari
Serie B promotion as third place: 1997–98
Serie B promotion as winner: 2003–04

References

External links
Profile at Lega-Calcio.it

1974 births
Living people
People from Sesto San Giovanni
Italian footballers
U.S. Lecce players
Cagliari Calcio players
Inter Milan players
Bologna F.C. 1909 players
U.S. Triestina Calcio 1918 players
S.S.D. Lucchese 1905 players
S.S.D. Pro Sesto players
F.C. Vado players
Serie A players
Serie B players
Serie C players
Association football fullbacks
Footballers from Lombardy
Sportspeople from the Metropolitan City of Milan